Scopula aequifasciata is a moth of the family Geometridae. It was described by Hugo Theodor Christoph in 1881. It is found in the Russian Far East.

References

Moths described in 1881
aequifasciata
Endemic fauna of Russia
Moths of Asia